El Alto Municipality is located in Pedro Domingo Murillo Province, La Paz Department, Bolivia, and includes the city of El Alto.

El Alto municipality may also refer to:
 El Alto, Argentina, a village municipality in El Alto Department, Catamarca Province, Argentina
 El Alto, Peru, a village municipality in El Alto District, Talara Province, Peru

See also
 El Alto (disambiguation)

Municipality name disambiguation pages